Josephine Lorraine Malach (March 23, 1933 – March 3, 2003) was a Canadian ceramic artist, ceramic muralist and painter.

Personal history
She was born at Regina, Saskatchewan in 1933, the only child of Stan and Beth Malach. She was educated at Sacred Heart Academy and the School of Art, both in Regina. At the urging of her instructors at the School of Art she took further study in Philadelphia at Barnes Foundation and Pennsylvania Academy of Fine Arts. She studied in Europe on several Study Tour Awards.

Body of work
Lorraine Malach was known as "An eminent Canadian Artist of immeasurable talent"  Her works, include ceramic panels, paintings, and murals that are displayed in many churches, schools, public buildings and are held in private collections including in the Vatican. She carefully planned and researched each commission, often requiring a number of years work. She worked over two years on the ceramic mural created for the Royal Tyrell Museum in Drumheller. Malach took her vocation seriously and had a work ethic that enabled her to create many lasting works. "...she made art everyday of her life, and hardly anyone else did. She was constantly seeking to say something and do something."

The Story of Life
Her final and one of her most remarkable works is The Story of Life. It is a ceramic mural created for the Royal Tyrrell Museum of Palaeontology, Drumheller, Alberta, Canada. The mural consists of ten panels, each four feet wide and eight feet high; ten tons of clay were used. It depicts life forms from the Precambrian to the Cretaceous, as told by human-based figures.

Death
Lorraine Malach died on March 3, 2003, at Drumheller, Alberta, several weeks before her 70th birthday and before the completion of the work. Her friends and colleagues undertook to complete the work. The two remaining pieces were fired in a kiln and the mural was completed by Janet Grabner.

See also
 List of Canadian artists

References

Further reading
 Biographical index of artists in Canada by Evelyn De R. McMann, citing Josephine Lorraine Malach

External links
 Yvonne portrait
 Group of Four ceramic work
 Holy Rosary Cathedral
 Sacred Heart School
 Cathy Page article
 Saskatchewan NCA Artist Information
 Timeless Spirit Magazine Article May 2005
 Biographical Article, Virtual Museum
 Note about Story of Life
 Journal of Canadian Art History article
 
 Virtual Museum, Wanyen Morgan commentary

1933 births
2003 deaths
Artists from Regina, Saskatchewan
Canadian ceramists
Canadian muralists
20th-century Canadian painters
Women potters
20th-century Canadian women artists
20th-century ceramists
Canadian women ceramists
Women muralists